Parvalbumin (PV) is a calcium-binding protein with low molecular weight (typically 9-11 kDa). In humans, it is encoded by the PVALB gene. It is not a member of the albumin family; it is named for its size (parv-, from Latin parvus small) and its ability to coagulate.

It has three EF hand motifs and is structurally related to calmodulin and troponin C. Parvalbumin is found in fast-contracting muscles, where its levels are highest, as well as in the brain and some endocrine tissues.

Parvalbumin is a small, stable protein containing EF-hand type calcium binding sites. It is involved in calcium signaling. Typically, this protein is broken into three domains, domains AB, CD and EF, each individually containing a helix-loop-helix motif. The AB domain houses a two amino-acid deletion in the loop region, whereas domains CD and EF contain the N-terminal and C-terminal, respectively.

Calcium binding proteins like parvalbumin play a role in many physiological processes, namely cell-cycle regulation, second messenger production, muscle contraction, organization of microtubules and phototransduction. Therefore, calcium-binding proteins must distinguish calcium in the presence of high concentrations of other metal ions. The mechanism for the calcium selectivity has been extensively studied.

Location and function

Parvalbumin in neural tissue 
Parvalbumin is present in some GABAergic interneurons in the nervous system, especially the reticular thalamus, and expressed predominantly by chandelier and basket cells in the cortex. In the cerebellum, PV is expressed in Purkinje cells and molecular layer interneurons. In the hippocampus, PV+ interneurons are subdivided into basket, axo-axonic, and bistratified cells, each subtype targeting distinct compartments of pyramidal cells.

PV interneurons' connections are mostly perisomatic (around the cell body of neurons). Most of the PV interneurons are fast-spiking. They are also thought to give rise to gamma waves recorded in EEG.

PV-expressing interneurons represent approximately 25% of GABAergic cells in the primate DLPFC.  Other calcium-binding protein markers are calretinin (most abundant subtype in DLPFC, about 50%) and calbindin. Interneurons are also divided into subgroups by the expression of neuropeptides such as somatostatin, neuropeptide Y, cholecystokinin.

Parvalbumin in muscular tissue 
PV is known to be involved in relaxation of fast-twitch muscle fibers. This function is associated with PV role in calcium sequestration.

During muscle contraction, the action potential stimulate voltage-sensitive proteins in T-tubules membrane. These proteins stimulate the opening of Ca2+ channels in the sarcoplasmic reticulum, leading to release of Ca2+ in the sarcoplasm. The Ca2+ ions bind to troponin, what causes the displacement of tropomyosin, a protein that prevents myosin walking along actin. The displacement of tropomyosin exposes the myosin-binding sites on actin, permitting muscle contraction.

This way, while muscle contraction is driven by Ca2+ release, muscle relaxation is driven by Ca2+ removal from sarcoplasm. Along with Ca2+ pumps, PV contributes to Ca2+ removal from cytoplasm: PV binds to Ca2+ ions in the sarcoplasm, and then shuttles it to the sarcoplasmic reticulum.

Role in pathology 

Decreased PV and GAD67 expression was found in PV+ GABAergic interneurons in schizophrenia.

Parvalbumin and food allergy
Parvalbumin has been identified as an allergen causing fish allergy (but not shellfish allergy). Bony fishes manifest β-parvalbumin and cartilaginous fishes such as sharks and rays manifest α-parvalbumin; allergenicity to bony fishes has a low cross-reactivity to cartilaginous fishes.

History 
The protein was discovered in 1965 as a component of the fast-twitching white muscle of fish. It was described as a low molecular-weight "albumin". It is unknown who coined the term parvalbumin, but the word is already in use by 1967.

References

External links 
 
 

Molecular neuroscience
EF-hand-containing proteins
Articles containing video clips